The National Institute of Tourism and Hospitality Management is an Indian hospitality university.

The campus is located on a 30-acre expanse. It is located in the Business and Education hub in Gachibowli of Hyderabad with a built-up area of about 2 lakh square-foot in multiple blocks.

History 
It began academic operations in October 2004. It was formally inaugurated by Indian National Congress President Sonia Gandhi on 16 March 2005. It was established under the provisions of Andhra Pradesh Societies Registration Act - 2001.

Neighborhood
The Institute is modeled on institutions like Indian Institute of Technology and Indian Institute of Manufacturing and internationally like Harvard Business School and Cornell University.

Campus
The campus is seated on 30-acres of green area, with a small lake covering the front of the campus. The project was designed by M/s Upal Ghosh Associates, New Delhi and executed by Telangana Tourism Development Corporation.

Neighborhood 
NITHM is located at the center of the business district of Gachibowli and Hitech city.

Degrees 

 Master of Business Administration (Tourism & Hospitality)
 Bachelor of Business Administration (Tourism & Hospitality)
 B.Sc. (Hospitality & Hotel Administration)
 Diploma in Food Production (Chef)

Library 
NITHM Library has a RFID Based Library Management Systems with KOHA Library Automation Software. It has a collection of 8000 books, 70 national/international journals, magazines, and newspapers. The library hall covers about 5000 sq. ft. of floor space. NITHM also organised library week celebrations and book exhibitions every year.

Faculty, staff, and students are members of the Library and are entitled to access Library documents/services. JNTU, UGC, AICTE, NCHMCT, and WTO Sponsored Research scholars can apply to become members of the Library.

References

 
 
 
 
 
 
 
 

Hospitality schools in India
 Universities and colleges in Telangana
2004 establishments in Andhra Pradesh
 Educational institutions established in 2004